Umakanta Roy was an Indian politician, belonging to the Revolutionary Communist Party of India and a member of the West Bengal Legislative Assembly 1985-1987.

1985 by-election
After the death of the incumbent Hansan constituency legislator Trilochan Mal, Roy was elected to the West Bengal Legislative Assembly in a by-election held on 25 April 1985. Roy obtained 37,573 votes (51.55%) against 34,095 votes for the Indian National Congress candidate A. Mal and 1,216 votes for independent candidate B. Marjit.

Later period
Roy did not contest the 1987 West Bengal Legislative Assembly election. In the 1991 West Bengal Legislative Assembly election Roy stood as a candidate of the RCPI splinter group (Gouranga Sit faction) in Hansan, against the official RCPI candidate Trilochan Das. Roy obtained 983 votes (1.09%).

References

Members of the West Bengal Legislative Assembly
Revolutionary Communist Party of India politicians
Possibly living people